Stigmaulax is a genus of predatory sea snails, marine gastropod mollusks in the subfamily Naticinae of the family Naticidae, the moon snails.

Species
Species within the genus Stigmaulax include:
 Stigmaulax cancellatus (Hermann, 1781)
 Stigmaulax cayennensis (Récluz, 1850)
 Stigmaulax elenae (Récluz, 1844)
 Stigmaulax kushime (Shikama, 1971)
 Stigmaulax sulcatus (Born, 1778)

References

  Shikama, T. 1971. On some noteworthy marine gastropoda from southwestern Japan (III). Science Reports of the Yokohama National University, section 2 (Geol.), 18:27-35, pl. 3.
 Torigoe K. & Inaba A. (2011). Revision on the classification of Recent Naticidae. Bulletin of the Nishinomiya Shell Museum. 7: 133 + 15 pp., 4 pls.

External links
 Mörch, O. A. L. (1852-1853). Catalogus conchyliorum quae reliquit D. Alphonso d'Aguirra & Gadea Comes de Yoldi, Regis Daniae Cubiculariorum Princeps, Ordinis Dannebrogici in Prima Classe & Ordinis Caroli Tertii Eques. Fasc. 1, Cephalophora, 170 pp. (1852); Fasc. 2, Acephala, Annulata, Cirripedia, Echinodermata, 74 (+2) pp. (1853). Hafniae (Copenhagen): L. Klein.

Naticidae